Amadalli  is a village in the southern state of Karnataka, India. It is located in the Karwar taluk of Uttara Kannada district in Karnataka.

Demographics
 India census, Amadalli had a population of 6593 with 3369 males and 3224 females.

See also
 Uttara Kannada
 Districts of Karnataka

References

External links
 

Villages in Uttara Kannada district